John Stephanie Holt (May 14, 1959 – February 13, 2013) was an American football cornerback in the National Football League (NFL) for the Tampa Bay Buccaneers and the Indianapolis Colts.  He played college football at West Texas State University.

References

1959 births
2013 deaths
Sportspeople from Lawton, Oklahoma
American football cornerbacks
West Texas A&M Buffaloes football players
Tampa Bay Buccaneers players
Indianapolis Colts players
Enid High School alumni